The men's 100 metres was the shortest of the sprint races at the 1908 Summer Olympics in London. The competition was held over the course of three days. The first round was held on 20 July, the semifinals on 21 July, and the final on 22 July. NOCs could enter up to 12 athletes, The event was won by Reggie Walker of South Africa, the first time the gold medal went to a nation other than the United States. The Americans did stay on the podium with James Rector's silver medal. Canada won its first medal in the event, a bronze by Robert Kerr.

Background

This was the fourth time the event was held. Nathaniel Cartmell, the 1904 silver medalist, competed again in 1908, but gold medalist Archie Hahn did not. Other notable entrants included John W. Morton of Great Britain, the four-time AAA Championships winner; Reggie Walker, the 1907 South African champion; and Knut Lindberg of Sweden, the unofficial world record holder.

Austria, Belgium, Finland, the Netherlands, Norway, and South Africa were represented in the event for the first time. The United States and Hungary were the only two nations to have appeared at each of the first four Olympic men's 100 metres events.

Competition format

With a larger field than in 1904, the event expanded from two rounds to three: heats, semifinals, and a final. Only the top runner in each heat, of which there were 17, advanced to the semifinals. These 17 semifinalists were divided into 4 semifinal heats; again, only the top runner advanced to the final.

Records

These were the standing world and Olympic records (in seconds) prior to the 1908 Summer Olympics.

(*) unofficial

James Rector (in the 15th heat and the third semi-final) and  Reggie Walker (in the first semi-final and final) both equalized the standing Olympic record. Reggie Walker's actual time in the first semi-final was 10.7, but was rounded up to the nearest fifth in accordance with rules in force at the time, so his time was given as 10.

Results

Heats

Times were kept for the winning runner in each heat only.  They were measured to the closest  second.  The fastest runner advanced to the second round.  The competition began at 3 p.m. on 20 July, the seventh day of the Games.  A break was taken after the first nine heats to allow for four heats of the 800 metres to be run at 3:30 p.m., with the final eight heats of the 100 metres commencing at 4 p.m.

Heat 1

Duffy won this heat by three yards.

Heat 2

George was ahead of Guttormsen by three yards when he finished.

Heat 3

Cartmell crossed the finish line two yards ahead of Malfait.

Heat 4

Walker was four yards ahead of the field when he finished. Records do not indicate which of the final two runners took which place.

Heat 5

Harmer pulled up lame. Cloughen won by five yards.

Heat 6

May won by about three yards.

Heat 7

Duncan won by a yard.

Heat 8

Stevens beat world record holder Lindberg by inches.

Heat 9

Morton won by about three yards.

Heat 10

Fischer pulled up lame, leaving Kerr to defeat Chapman by three yards.

Heat 11

Phillips pulled up lame, allowing Hamilton to win by about three yards.

Heat 12

Huff was only about a yard ahead of Pankhurst when he finished.

Heat 13

Robertson won by about three yards.

Heat 14

Sherman's lead of four yards at the finish was one of the larger leads in the first round.

Heat 15

Rector's Olympic record-tying time gave him a relatively easy victory in the first round.

Heat 16

In one of the slowest of the first round heads, Stark won by about two yards.

Heat 17

Roche won by about two yards.

Semifinals

The fastest runner in each semifinal advanced to the final.  The semifinals were begun at 3:35 p.m. on 21 July.

Semifinal 1

Cloughen withdrew to prepare for the 200m heats. Walker took the lead after about 50 metres and crossed the line about a yard in front of May to become the second sprinter to tie the Olympic record at the London Games. His actual time was 10.7, rounded up to the nearest fifth, in accordance with rules in force at the time; therefore, his time was given as 10.

Semifinal 2

Hamilton withdrew to prepare for the 200m heats. Kerr had little difficulty winning this heat, leading by three yards at the finish.

Semifinal 3

Rector again won easily, tying the Olympic record for the second time.

Semifinal 4

Cartmell and Robertson ran a tight race, with Cartmell winning by about a foot.

Final

The Final of the 100 metres began at 4:15 p.m. on 22 July.

With Walker and Rector having already equalled the Olympic record before the final, it was widely expected that the final race of the 100 metres would be an exciting match between those two runners.

Walker got off to a quick lead, but Rector caught him about midway through the race and passed him. Walker responded with a great effort, pulling level with Rector, and the two ran side-by-side before Walker finally pulled ahead to win by half a yard. 

Rector finished six inches ahead of Kerr, who finished two yards ahead of Cartmell for third place.

References

 
 
 

Men's 0100 metres
100 metres at the Olympics